Young Friend Forever is a 2014 Chinese romance film directed by Zhao Chong. It was released on October 10.

Cast
Sun Qian
Tai Li
Peng Bo
Tang Jingmei
Zhang Qun
Li Ruojia
Wu Hong

Reception
By October 11, the film had earned ¥0.23 million at the Chinese box office.

References

Chinese romance films
2014 romance films
2014 films
2010s Mandarin-language films